Camenzind is a Swiss German surname, most prevalent in Switzerland.

Notable people
Notable people with this surname include:
 Alberto Camenzind (1914–2004), Swiss architect
 Hans Camenzind (1934–2012), electronics engineer, famous for designing the 555 timer IC
 Oscar Camenzind (born 1971), Swiss cyclist

Fictitious characters
Fictitious characters with this surname include:
 Peter Camenzind, title character of a 1904 Hermann Hesse novel

References